Takayus is a genus of Asian comb-footed spiders (family Theridiidae) that was first described by H. Yoshida in 2001.

Species
 it contains seventeen species, found in Asia:
Takayus chikunii (Yaginuma, 1960) – China, Japan
Takayus codomaculatus Yin, 2012 – China
Takayus fujisawai Yoshida, 2002 – Japan
Takayus huanrenensis (Zhu & Gao, 1993) – China
Takayus kunmingicus (Zhu, 1998) – China
Takayus latifolius (Yaginuma, 1960) – Russia (Far East), China, Korea, Japan
Takayus linimaculatus (Zhu, 1998) – China
Takayus lunulatus (Guan & Zhu, 1993) – Russia (Far East), China, Korea
Takayus lushanensis (Zhu, 1998) – China
Takayus naevius (Zhu, 1998) – China
Takayus papiliomaculatus Yin, Peng & Zhang, 2005 – China
Takayus quadrimaculatus (Song & Kim, 1991) – China, Korea
Takayus simplicus Yin, 2012 – China
Takayus sublatifolius (Zhu, 1998) – China
Takayus takayensis (Saito, 1939) (type) – China, Korea, Japan
Takayus wangi (Zhu, 1998) – China
Takayus xui (Zhu, 1998) – China

Formerly included:
T. lyricus (Walckenaer, 1841) (Transferred to Yunohamella)
T. subadultus (Bösenberg & Strand, 1906) (Transferred to Yunohamella)
T. yunohamensis (Bösenberg & Strand, 1906) (Transferred to Yunohamella)

In synonymy:
T. wolmerensis (Paik, 1996) = Takayus quadrimaculatus (Song & Kim, 1991)

See also
 List of Theridiidae species

References

Further reading

Araneomorphae genera
Spiders of Asia
Theridiidae